Yonemoto (written:  or ) is a Japanese surname. Notable people with the surname include:

Bruce and Norman Yonemoto, American installation artist
, Japanese badminton player
, Japanese badminton player
, Japanese footballer

Japanese-language surnames